Pectinimura rhabdostoma is a moth in the family Lecithoceridae. It is found in Papua New Guinea.

The length of the forewings is 6–7 mm. The forewings have distinct, large blackish stigmata.

References

Moths described in 1954
rhabdostoma